In French cuisine, an entrée is a prelude to a larger course within a single meal.

Entrée may also refer to:

 In English or French language, can describe the act or manner of entering; freedom of entry or access 
 A North American synonym for the main course
 Entrée (ballet), ballet term for an entrance
 Entrée de ballet, an autonomous scene of ballet de cour or other staged forms
 European Network for Training and Research in Electrical Engineering, often abbreviated to ENTREE
 ENTREE Travel Newsletter, a travel newsletter established 1981
 "Entrée" (Hannibal), an episode of the television series Hannibal